The Bayview School II in Bayview in Kootenai County, Idaho was a historic school built in 1911.  It was listed on the National Register of Historic Places in 1985.

It replaced a 1900-built one-room log schoolhouse which had been Bayview's first schoolhouse. It has elements of Colonial Revival architecture including a truncated hipped roof on the main section.

Its location was on the south side of Careywood Road, about 1/2 mile west of Scenic Bay.

The school may no longer exist.

References

School buildings on the National Register of Historic Places in Idaho
Colonial Revival architecture in Idaho
School buildings completed in 1911
Kootenai County, Idaho
1911 establishments in Idaho